List of rivers in São Paulo (Brazilian State).

The list is arranged by drainage basin from north to south, with respective tributaries indented under each larger stream's name and ordered from downstream to upstream. All rivers in São Paulo drain to the Atlantic Ocean.

By Drainage Basin

Atlantic Coast 

 Paraíba do Sul
 Barra Mansa River
 Bananal River
 Barreiro de Baixo River
 Sesmarias River
 Do Salto River
 Itagacaba River
 Bocaina River
 Guaratinguetá River
 Buquira River
 Jaguari River
 Parateí River  (Lambari-Parateí River)
 Do Peixe River
 Pilões River
 Itapeti River
 Paraibuna River
 Lourenço Velho River
 Do Peixe River
 Ipiranga River
 Paraitinga River
 Itaim River
 Jacuí River
 Comprido River
 Bracuí River
 Mambucaba River
 Puruba River
 Camburu River
 Itapanhaú River
 Cubatão River
 Branco River
 Comprido River
 Guaraú River
 Una do Prelado River
 Ribeira de Iguape River
 Una da Aldeia River
 Itimirim River
 Itinguçu River
 Espraiado River
 Das Pedras River
 Pariquera-Açu River
 Jacupiranga River
 Juquiá River
 Quilombo River
 São Lourenço River
 Pardo River
 Itapirapuã River

Paraná Basin 

 Paraná River
 Paranapanema River
 Pirapozinho River
 Taquaruçu River
 Capivara River
 Capivari River
 Novo River
 Pardo River
 Turvo River
 Alambari River
 Novo River
 Claro River
 Palmital River
 Itararé River
 Verde River
 Da Água Morta River
 Taquari-Guaçu River
 Guareí River
 Apiai-Guaçu River
 Apiai-Mirim River
 São José do Guapiara River
 Itapetininga River
 Turvo River
 Pinhal Grande River
 Das Almas River
 Santo Anastácio River
 Do Peixe River
 Aguapeí River
 Tibiriça River
 Tietê River
 Dourado River
 Ribeirão Barra Mansa
 Batalha River
 São Lourenço River
 Claro River
 Jacaré-Guaçu River
 Chibarro River
 Boa Esperança River
 Monjolinho River
 Jacaré Pepira River
 Jaú River
 Ribeirão Grande
 Bauru River
 Lençóis River
 Araguá River
 Piracicaba River
 Corumbataí River
 Passa Cinco River
 Jaguari River
 Camanducaia River
 Atibaia River
 Anhumas River
 Das Pedras River
 Cachoeira River
 Alambari River
 Do Peixe River
 Capivari River
 Sorocaba River
 Guarapó River
 Tatuí River
 Sarapuí River
 Avecutá River
 Jundiaí River
 Jundiuvira River
 Juqueri River
 Cotia River
 Pinheiros River (Jurabatuba River)
 Guarapiranga River
 Embu-Mirim River
 Embu-Guaçu River
 Pequeno River
 Tamanduateí River
 Anhangabaú River
 Ipiranga Brook
 Aricanduva River
 Cabuçu de Cima River (Guapira River)
 Baquirivu-Guaçu River
 Guaio River
 Taiaçupeba River
 Taiaçupeba-Mirim River
 Jundiaí River
 Biritiba-Mirim River
 Paraitinga River
 Claro River
 São José dos Dourados River
 Grande River
 Paulo Diniz River
 Turvo River
 Preto River
 Jataí River
 Cachoeirinha River
 São Domingos River
 Pardo River
 Velho River
 Moji-Guaçu River
 Quilombo River
 Jaguari Mirim River
 Itupeva River
 Oriçanga River
 Moji-Mirim River
 Rio do Peixe
 Araraquara River
 Canoas River
 Guaxupé River
 Sapucai River
 Sapucai-Mirim River

Alphabetically 

 Aguapeí River
 Alambari River
 Alambari River
 Das Almas River
 Anhangabaú River
 Apiai-Guaçu River
 Apiai-Mirim River
 Da Água Morta River
 Araguá River
 Araraquara River
 Aricanduva River
 Atibaia River
 Avecutá River
 Bananal River
 Baquirivu-Guaçu River
 Barra Mansa River
 Ribeirão Barra Mansa
 Barreiro de Baixo River
 Batalha River
 Bauru River
 Biritiba-Mirim River
 Boa Esperança River
 Bocaina River
 Bracuí River
 Branco River
 Buquira River
 Cabuçu de Cima River (Guapira River)
 Cachoeira River
 Cachoeirinha River
 Camanducaia River
 Camburu River
 Canoas River
 Capivara River
 Capivari River
 Capivari River
 Claro River
 Claro River
 Claro River
 Comprido River
 Comprido River
 Corumbataí River
 Cotia River
 Cubatão River
 Dourado River
 Embu-Guaçu River
 Embu-Mirim River
 Grande River
 Ribeirão Grande
 Guaio River
 Guarapó River
 Guarapiranga River
 Guaratinguetá River
 Guareí River
 Guaxupé River
 Ipiranga Brook
 Ipiranga River
 Itaim River
 Itagacaba River
 Itapanhaú River
 Itapeti River
 Itapetininga River
 Itapirapuã River
 Itararé River
 Itimirim River
 Itinguçu River
 Itupeva River
 Jacaré Pepira River
 Jacaré-Guaçu River
 Jacuí River
 Jacupiranga River
 Jaguari River
 Jaguari Mirim River
 Jaguari River
 Jataí River
 Jaú River
 Jundiaí River
 Jundiaí River (upper Tietê River tributary)
 Jundiuvira River
 Juqueri River
 Juquiá River
 Lençóis River
 Lourenço Velho River
 Mambucaba River
 Moji-Guaçu River
 Moji-Mirim River
 Monjolinho River
 Novo River
 Novo River
 Oriçanga River
 Palmital River
 Paraíba do Sul
 Paraibuna River
 Paraitinga River
 Paraitinga River
 Paraná River
 Paranapanema River
 Parateí River (Lambari-Parateí River)
 Pardo River
 Pardo River
 Pardo River
 Pariquera-Açu River
 Passa Cinco River
 Paulo Diniz River
 Das Pedras River
 Das Pedras River
 Do Peixe River
 Rio do Peixe (Mojiguaçu River)
 Do Peixe River
 Do Peixe River
 Do Peixe River
 Pequeno River
 Pilões River
 Pinhal Grande River
 Pinheiros River (Jurabatuba River)
 Piracicaba River
 Pirapozinho River
 Preto River
 Puruba River
 Quilombo River
 Quilombo River
 Ribeira de Iguape River
 Santo Anastácio River
 Do Salto River
 São Domingos River
 São José do Guapiara River
 São José dos Dourados River
 São Lourenço River
 São Lourenço River
 Sapucai River
 Sapucai-Mirim River
 Sarapuí River
 Sesmarias River
 Sorocaba River
 Taiaçupeba River
 Taiaçupeba-Mirim River
 Tamanduateí River
 Taquari-Guaçu River
 Taquaruçu River
 Tatuí River
 Tibiriça River
 Tietê River
 Turvo River
 Turvo River
 Turvo River
 Velho River
 Verde River

References
 Map from Ministry of Transport
 Rand McNally, The New International Atlas, 1993.
  GEOnet Names Server

 
São Paulo
Rivers
Environment of São Paulo (state)